Nine ships of the French Navy have borne the name Redoutable ("Redoubtable"):

Ships named Redoutable 
 , 74-gun ship of the line. She took part in the landing in Mahon under Admiral la Galissonière. She was destroyed in Lagos in 1759.
 , a 74-gun ship of the line. One of her snipers killed Admiral Nelson at the Battle of Trafalgar.
 Redoutable (1801) a coastguard.
 Redoutable (1804) a xebec.
  (1876), the first warship in the world to be built in steel.
  (1930), lead ship of the s before the Second World War
  (1971), first SNLE submarine of the French Navy, now a museum and the largest submarine in the world open to the public.

See also

Notes and references

Notes

References

Bibliography
 
 

French Navy ship names